The Get O. EP is an EP by Swamp Terrorists, released on October 24, 1994, by Cashbeat/Sub/Mission Records.

Track listing

Personnel
Adapted from the liner notes of The Get O. EP.

Swamp Terrorists
 Michael Antener (as STR) – programming
 Ane Hebeisen (as Ane H.) – lead vocals

Release history

References

External links 
 The Get O. EP at Discogs (list of releases)

1994 EPs
Remix EPs
Swamp Terrorists albums